Nikola Vujović may refer to:

 Nikola Vujović (footballer, born 1981), Montenegrin footballer
 Nikola Vujović (footballer, born 1990), Serbian footballer